Cheng Kuei-lien (born 25 December 1961) is a Taiwanese politician who served in the Legislative Yuan from 2002 to 2005.

Academic career
Cheng attended Soochow University and later taught at Cheng Shiu Institute of Technology.

Political career
She served on the third National Assembly and was elected to the Legislative Yuan in 2001. A 2003 assessment by the Association Monitoring the Nomination of Grand Justices determined that Cheng ranked second-worst at interpellation. In 2004, she referred to Chen Chi-mai and Gao Jyh-peng as "little bastards" and compared the duo to communists, claiming that they had stopped her from running for re-election by supporting other Democratic Progressive Party candidates.

Personal life
Cheng is married to Yu Cheng-hsien.

References

1961 births
Living people
21st-century Taiwanese women politicians
Party List Members of the Legislative Yuan
Members of the 5th Legislative Yuan
Democratic Progressive Party Members of the Legislative Yuan
Soochow University (Taiwan) alumni
Academic staff of Cheng Shiu University
Yu family of Kaohsiung
Politicians of the Republic of China on Taiwan from Kaohsiung
Spouses of Taiwanese politicians